Heteropodatoxins are peptide toxins from the venom of the giant crab spider Heteropoda venatoria, which block Kv4.2 voltage-gated potassium channels.

Sources 

Heteropodatoxins are purified from the venom of the giant crab spider, Heteropoda venatoria .

Chemistry 

Heteropodatoxins contain an Inhibitor Cystine Knot (ICK) motif, which consist of a compact disulfide-bonded core, from which four loops emerge . There are three different heteropodatoxins : 
 heteropodatoxin-1, also known as Toxin AU3/KJ5 or HpTx1
 heteropodatoxin-2, also known as Toxin KJ6 or HpTx2
 heteropodatoxin-3, also known as Toxin AU5C/KJ7 or HpTx3

These three toxins are structurally similar peptides of 29-32 amino acids . They show sequence similarity to Hanatoxins, which can be isolated from the venom of the Chilean rose tarantula Grammostola rosea .

Target 

Heteropodatoxins block A-type, transient voltage-gated potassium channels. All three toxins have been shown to block the potassium channel Kv4.2 . Recombinant heteropodatoxin-2 blocks the potassium channels Kv4.1, Kv4.2 and Kv4.3, but not Kv1.4, Kv2.1, or Kv3.4 .

Mode of action 

Heterpodatoxin-2 most likely acts as a gating modifier of the Kv4.2 channels .  It shifts the voltage dependence of the activation and the inactivation of the Kv4.3 potassium channel to more positive values. As a result, in the presence of the toxin this channel has a higher probability of being inactivated and a larger depolarization is needed to open the channel. However, heterpodatoxin-2 did not affect the voltage dependence of the Kv4.1 channel, suggesting that the precise mechanism of block remains to be elucidated  and a role as a pore blocker cannot be excluded . The voltage dependence of Kv4.2 block varies among the three different heteropodatoxins. It is less voltage dependent for HpTx1 than for HpTx2 or HpTx3 .

Toxicity 

The giant crab spider can cause a locally painful bite.

References

Bibliography 

Ion channel toxins